Chang Chih-chiang (born 22 October 1978 in Taiwan) is a Taiwanese baseball pitcher for Uni-President Lions of Chinese Professional Baseball League (CPBL). He got his first career win on 7 July 2005. He is a starting pitcher for the Lions. Because of his resemblance to Kuo Yuen-chih, a famous Taiwanese baseball player who had a successful baseball career in Japan before retiring, he was assigned the number 33, the same number Kuo wore during almost his entire career. He is nicknamed by fans as Ban-chang (literally "squad leader") due to his experience in the army. Teammate Wang Tzu-sung also served in his squad while in the army.

Career statistics

Last updated June 3, 2008

See also
 Chinese Professional Baseball League
 Uni-President Lions

References 

1978 births
Living people
Baseball pitchers
People from Taitung County
Taiwanese baseball players
Uni-President 7-Eleven Lions players
Uni-President Lions players